DuraCloud is an open source digital preservation software originally developed by DuraSpace and maintained by LYRASIS since the merger in 2019. The DuraCloud open source software is available under the terms of the Apache License, Version 2.0. It is also available as a hosted SAAS through LYRASIS and Texas Digital Library.  Users can efficiently upload content via the SyncTool, REST API, command line, and staff interface and content can be stored in Amazon Web Services S3 or Glacier services and/or Chronopolis. DuraCloud performs regular fixity checks on provides automatic error reporting. It was primarily designed to be a back-end preservation system but also has the optional ability to provide public links to content.

History
In 2009, The Library of Congress National Digital Information Infrastructure and Preservation Program (NDIIPP) and DuraSpace announced a joint pilot program to test the use of cloud technologies to enable perpetual access to digital content with DuraCloud. The pilot program entered a second phase in 2010. Several open source releases of the DuraCloud software led to the public launch of the managed service on November 7, 2011. DuraCloud is supported by the DuraSpace organization.

DuraCloud 2.0 was released on April 17, 2012.

DuraSpace was acquired by LYRASIS in 2019, which continued the maintenance and hosting services.

See also
Cloud computing
Cloud storage
Digital preservation
DSpace

References

External links
DuraCloud Guide (user documentation)
DuraCloud free trial link
Kimpton, M., Payette, S., Using Cloud Infrastructure as Part of a Digital Preservation Strategy with DuraCloud: EDUCAUSE Quarterly Magazine, Vol. 33, Number 2, 2010
Johnson, K., DuraCloud Protects Against Cloud Failures: Wired Cloudline (blog). April 19, 2012
Brazingon, A., DuraCloud Offers Redundant Storage Across Multiple Cloud Providers: Campus Technology (blog). May 1, 2012

Free software